This is a list of members of the Victorian Legislative Assembly, from the elections of 20 September 1894 to the elections of  14 October 1897. From 1889 there were 95 seats in the Assembly.

Victoria was a British self-governing colony in Australia at the time.

Note the "Term in Office" refers to that member's term(s) in the Assembly, not necessarily for that electorate.

Graham Berry was Speaker, Francis Mason was Chairman of Committees.

 Anderson died 10 April 1897; replaced by Peter McBride, sworn-in June 1897.
 Ievers died 19 February 1895; replaced by John Barrett, sworn-in May 1895.
 Patterson died 30 October 1895; replaced by James Whiteside McCay, sworn-in November 1895.
 Scott left Parliament in June 1896; replaced by John Neil McArthur, sworn-in July 1896.
 Smith died 20 October 1894; replaced by Joseph Kirton, sworn-in November 1894.
 Winter died 2 May 1896; replaced by John Tucker, sworn-in June 1896.

References

Further reading

Members of the Parliament of Victoria by term
19th-century Australian politicians